Raúl Erasto Gutiérrez Jacobo (born 16 October 1966), also known as El Potro, is a Mexican professional football manager and former player. At the 2011 FIFA U-17 World Cup, he coached the Mexico U-17 team to their second title.

Playing career 
He was a part of the Mexico national team in the 1994 FIFA World Cup. He was capped in 37 games for the Mexico national football team. He played for Atlante F.C. from 1988 until 1994, and he played for Club América from 1994 until 2001.

Managerial career

Mexico U-17 
As the coach of the Mexico U-17 national team, he won the 2011 FIFA U-17 World Cup. This was Mexico's second FIFA U-17 World Cup title, and also became the first team to win the tournament at home.

He continued to coach Mexico U-17 in 2013, in which he qualified them to the 2013 FIFA U-17 World Cup. Mexico started the U-17 World cup with a 6–1 loss to Nigeria, but recovered with a 3–1 win against Iraq. Mexico would reach the final after beating teams like Italy, Brazil, and Argentina. In the final, Mexico would lose once again with Nigeria 3–0.

Mexico Olympic Football Team 
After the success at U-17 level, it was made official that Raúl Gutiérrez will coach the Mexico U-21 team, which will participate in the Central American and Caribbean Games, 2015 Pan American Games, 2015 CONCACAF Men's Olympic Qualifying Championship, and 2016 Summer Olympics.

Atlante 
On 6 June 2017, Gutiérrez was named the head coach of Atlante FC.

On 22 October 2017, Atlante announced they had parted ways with Gutiérrez, after a 4–1 loss against Tampico Madero.

Managerial statistics

Managerial statistics

Honours

Player
Potros Neza
Segunda División De Mexico: 1988–89

Atlante
Mexican Primera División: 1992–93
Segunda División de Mexico:  1990–91

América
CONCACAF Giants Cup: 2001

Mexico
CONCACAF Gold Cup: 1996

Manager
Mexico Youth
FIFA U-17 World Cup: 2011
Central American and Caribbean Games: 2014
Pan American Silver Medal: 2015
CONCACAF Men's Olympic Qualifying Tournament: 2015

References

playerhistory 
fifa.com
fifa.com
fifa.com

1966 births
Living people
Mexico international footballers
CONCACAF Gold Cup-winning players
1993 Copa América players
1995 Copa América players
1994 FIFA World Cup players
1995 King Fahd Cup players
Atlante F.C. footballers
Club América footballers
Club León footballers
Footballers from Mexico City
Mexican footballers
Association football defenders
1996 CONCACAF Gold Cup players